is a Japan-exclusive video game that was released for the Family Computer in 1986.

Summary

Players get to dig up dirt beneath the surface, find keys behind four doors, and then find the door to the next level. The most obvious game to compare it to is Dig Dug, but without the boulders and with various devices like teleporting doors, speed, dynamite, and a wet suit. There are 15 levels in the entire game; which repeat themselves after the 15th level is finished.

Lava can spew out at a vertical direction towards the player and kill him; it does not reset itself even after the players loses a life (but it does reset itself after a game over) Passwords are activated by pressing a certain button combination on the password screen. Several passwords results in cheat codes that does certain things; such as deactivating the lava in all levels of the game.

Certain type of blocks are worth different points once they are dug up; ranging from common dirt to destructible blocks. The game features an instant death clause where players die in a single hit. Killed enemies reappear at the same location where they were killed the first time.

References

External links
Hottāman no Chitei Tanken at MobyGames

1986 video games
Action video games
Japan-exclusive video games
Nintendo Entertainment System games
Nintendo Entertainment System-only games
Top-down video games
Use Corporation games
Video games developed in Japan